Harry Graeme Porteous (20 January 1875 – 19 December 1951) was a New Zealand rugby union player. A wing forward, Porteous represented  at a provincial level. He was a member of the New Zealand national side for the 1903 tour of Australia, playing in three matches, but he did not appear in any internationals.

Porteous died in Wellington on 19 December 1951, and his ashes were buried at Karori Cemetery.

References

1875 births
1951 deaths
Burials at Karori Cemetery
New Zealand international rugby union players
New Zealand rugby union players
Otago rugby union players
Rugby union players from Otago
Rugby union wing-forwards